The '2022 QRL Women's Premiership' was the 3rd season of Queensland's  first top-level statewide open age women's competition. rugby league competition run by the Queensland Rugby League. The competition, known as the BMD Premiership due to sponsorship from BMD Group, is the top level of women's rugby league football in Queensland, Australia featured 8 teams playing a 9-week long season (including finals) from March to June.

Teams
The QRL Women's Premiership consists of eight teams, five from South East Queensland and one each from North Queensland, Central Queensland and Northern New South Wales. The league operates on a single group system, with no divisions or conferences and no relegation and promotion from other leagues.

Current clubs

Previous clubs

References

Women's rugby league competitions in Australia
2022 in women's rugby league
2022 in Australian women's sport